Erazm Parczewski (1826, Ociąż – 1915) was a Polish activist. He was a member of the Reichstag as a representative of the Polish Party.

1826 births
1915 deaths
People from Ostrów Wielkopolski County
People from the Grand Duchy of Posen
Polish Party politicians
Members of the 2nd Reichstag of the German Empire